The Little Mermaid is an upcoming American musical fantasy film directed by Rob Marshall from a screenplay written by David Magee. It is a live-action adaptation of Disney's 1989 animated film of the same name, which itself is loosely based on the 1837 fairy tale of the same title by Hans Christian Andersen. The film stars Halle Bailey in the titular role, Jonah Hauer-King, Daveed Diggs, Awkwafina, Jacob Tremblay, Noma Dumezweni, Javier Bardem, and Melissa McCarthy. 

Plans for a remake of 1989's The Little Mermaid were confirmed in May 2016. Marshall joined the film as director in December 2017, and much of the main cast signed on from June to November 2019. Filming took place primarily at Pinewood Studios in England from January to July 2021. 

The film was co-produced by Walt Disney Pictures, DeLuca Marshall and Marc Platt Productions. Lin-Manuel Miranda co-wrote new songs for the remake as the lyricist. Alan Menken returned as the composer for both the score and songs. It is scheduled to be released theatrically in the United States on May 26, 2023.

Premise
Ariel, the youngest daughter of the kingdom Atlantica's ruler King Triton, is fascinated with the human world but mermaids are forbidden to explore it.  After saving Prince Eric from a shipwreck and falling in love with him, she becomes determined to be with him in the world above water. These actions lead to a confrontation with her father and an encounter with the conniving sea witch Ursula, making a deal with her to trade her beautiful voice for human legs so she can discover the world above water and impress Eric. However, this ultimately places her life (and her father’s crown) in jeopardy.

Cast

 Halle Bailey as Ariel, a mermaid princess and King Triton's youngest daughter who is fascinated with the human world. Bailey was announced to have been cast on July 3, 2019.
 Jonah Hauer-King as Eric, a human prince whom Ariel falls in love with after saving him from drowning.
 Daveed Diggs as Sebastian, a loyal crab and King Triton's trusted servant and court composer who watches over Ariel.
 Awkwafina as Scuttle, a dimwitted northern gannet and a friend of Ariel's to whom she provides inaccurate descriptions of any human/surface world object Ariel finds. The character will be portrayed as a female diving bird instead of a male seagull as in the original in order to feature the character in underwater scenes.
 Jacob Tremblay as Flounder, an anxious yet noble tropical fish who is Ariel's best friend.
 Noma Dumezweni as Queen Selina, a new character for the film.
 Javier Bardem as King Triton, Ariel's overprotective father and the King of Atlantica who is prejudiced against humans.
 Melissa McCarthy as Ursula, a treacherous sea witch with octopus tentacles whom Ariel makes a deal with to become a human, which is secretly part of Ursula's plan to conquer Atlantica.

Art Malik will be portraying Grimsby, Eric's loyal butler and confidant who sees to it that Eric finds the right girl to marry. Also slated to appear are Lorena Andrea as Perla; Simone Ashley as Indira; Kajsa Mohammar as Karina; Nathalie Sorrell as Caspia; Karolina Conchet as Mala; and Sienna King as Tameka, the daughters of Triton and Ariel’s sisters, renamed for the film.

Additionally, Jessica Alexander, Russell Balogh, and Adrian Christopher have been cast in undisclosed roles.

Production

Development
In May 2016, Walt Disney Pictures began developing a live-action adaptation of Hans Christian Andersen's fairy tale "The Little Mermaid". Three months later, Lin-Manuel Miranda and Marc Platt signed on to produce the film, which was confirmed to be a remake of the Disney's 1989 animated film of the same name. On December 6, 2017, it was reported that Rob Marshall was being courted by the Walt Disney Company to direct the film, while Jane Goldman will serve as screenwriter. On December 5, 2018, Marshall revealed that he, along with John DeLuca and Marc Platt were hired to begin developing the project for film adaptation, and said that "John and [Marshall] have begun our work trying to explore it and figure it out", as he felt that "it's a very complicated movie to take from animation to live-action. Live-action's a whole other world so you have to be very careful about how that's done, but so we're starting the exploration phase". Later in December, Marshall was officially hired as director for the film. During an interview on December 21, 2018, Marshall revealed that the film is in very early stages of development, stating that the studio is trying to explore ways to translate the original film's story into live-action. On July 3, 2019, David Magee, who previously wrote the screenplay for Marshall's Mary Poppins Returns, was revealed to have written the script with Goldman. Magee would receive sole credit for the screenplay. On February 10, 2020, Miranda revealed that rehearsals for the film had already begun.

Casting

Both Lindsay Lohan and Chris Evans had expressed interest in starring in the adaptation, while some fans wanted Ariana Grande to play the role of Ariel. Zendaya was rumored to have been offered the title role from late 2018 to early 2019, but continuously stated that it was "just a rumor".

On June 28, 2019, it was announced that Melissa McCarthy was in talks to play Ursula in the film. On July 1, Awkwafina and Jacob Tremblay were cast in the film voicing a now gender-bent Scuttle and Ariel's sidekick Flounder, respectively.

On July 3, Halle Bailey was officially announced through Disney's official social media accounts to play the title role of Ariel, with the director stating:

Director Rob Marshall said that the film is about "[Ariel] finding her voice ... And that immediately just felt like an interesting, timely piece that resonated with [the production crew]". Bailey said that she wanted to bring "freshness" to the character and that "[i]t's amazing that the directors have been so forward in asking [her] to show [her] true self… that's been a really fun growing experience".

In the same month, Javier Bardem joined the cast as King Triton, while Harry Styles and Jack Whitehall considered the role of Prince Eric. However, in August 2019, it was revealed that Styles had turned down the part; he revealed in a November interview with Capital FM that there were a "few things" that they couldn't work out, he also stated: "I think it's obviously going to be an amazing film, but they shoot for so long and I wanna tour next year, maybe. I haven't announced that yet, but yeah, it just didn't quite line"; however, due to the COVID-19 pandemic, Styles's tour was postponed, and the role of Prince Eric eventually went to British actor Jonah Hauer-King.

In October, Daveed Diggs, who previously worked on Miranda's musical Hamilton, joined the cast as the voice of Sebastian the crab. By November 2019, Jonah Hauer-King had been cast as Prince Eric. Cameron Cuffe was also in the running for the role, before Hauer-King was cast; both of which had already screen tested alongside Bailey.

On February 18, 2020, McCarthy confirmed her casting as Ursula during an interview on The Ellen DeGeneres Show: "I play Ursula, the sea witch. It is so fun, we're just in rehearsals. It's been an absolute blast. Stepping into the world of Rob Marshall, it's like a fever dream, I just went to London for a week, I was like, 'I don't get to go to dance camp for a week.' All day he's like, 'Do you want to slide down this 40-foot clam shell?' I'm like, 'Yes! Of course I do. What are you, crazy?' It's been wildly creative."
In December 2020, Disney officially announced seven principal actors while also debuting the film's official logo.

On January 5, 2021, Noma Dumezweni was announced to have been cast in an undisclosed role. On March 29, 2021, in an interview with Marie Claire, when asked about her role in the upcoming film, Dumezweni stated, "I can tell you that I'm doing it. I can tell you I'm very excited. I can tell you I had a chat with hair and makeup the other day and it was like, Yay!". On December 29, 2021, during an interview on Facebook's Talks with Mama Tina, Bailey recalled being scared and nervous while auditioning for the role of Ariel. Co-star Daveed Diggs said that the remake will give "some more power" to Ariel than the original film.

Filming
Filming was originally scheduled to begin in London between late March and early April 2020; however, it was delayed due to the COVID-19 pandemic. Set photos at Pinewood Studios in London, England leaked a few weeks after the production was shut down, it showed aerial images featuring Prince Eric's ship as well as indoor images of what seemed to be his castle. On July 29, 2020, based on a social media post, Jacob Tremblay began recording his lines for the film. Filming was scheduled to re-commence on August 10, 2020.
By November 2020, Disney's new CEO Bob Chapek announced that filming on all movies that had been postponed during pandemic shutdowns had resumed filming, and in some cases completed principal photography.

In December 2020, McCarthy stated that she would hopefully begin filming in January 2021. The following month, Diggs discussed the large amount of work he had to do when it came to preparing for and recording dialogue for the role of Sebastian.

Principal photography officially began at Pinewood Studios in Iver, England on January 30, 2021. Filming for McCarthy's scenes eventually began in April 2021. On April 6, it was announced that additional filming would be happening in summer in Sardinia, Italy, for a total of "roughly three months." In June 2021, production was temporarily halted due to multiple crew members of the film contracting COVID-19. Filming resumed about a week later and officially wrapped on July 11, 2021. On December 30, 2021, Bailey shared some new behind-the-scenes photos of the set, including a glimpse of her portrayal of Ariel. The actress took to Instagram to wrap up her year and shared photos of moments of shooting the film. The first photo showed the film's script, which was blurred to avoid spoilers, but still showed her character name "Ariel" in bold print. One photo showed her swimming in Sardinia's waters, while another showed the process of film-making using CGI. In February 2023, Marshall revealed that he hopes post-production work on the film will be completed by March, saying:

Visual effects
Visual effects will be provided by Industrial Light & Magic, Wētā FX, Moving Picture Company and Framestore. DNEG will provide the stereo conversion. For the "Under the Sea" sequence, Marshall called it a "big, massive musical number" and said that creating the underwater environments involved "a lot of work in advance with John DeLuca and myself creating these musical sequences, to prep it in advance from storyboards to something called pre-visualization, which is almost like a little mini-animated film, so we know how it flowed and how it worked ... You are creating a world, you're creating creatures, but it's very important to me that it feels real – you have to believe, you have to care about them, you have to follow their journey."

Music

On March 17, 2017, it was announced that Alan Menken, who previously scored and co-wrote songs for the original film, would return as the film's composer and to write new songs alongside producer Lin-Manuel Miranda. Three months later, Menken stated that his work on the film's music had been put on hold due to Miranda and Marc Platt's schedules with Mary Poppins Returns. On May 20, 2019, Menken stated that The Little Mermaid would be his next project, following the release of the live-action adaptation of Aladdin, and on July 9, he and Miranda started working on new songs for the film. On replacing the original film's lyricist, the late Howard Ashman, Miranda felt that "[he] will definitely fall short" to Ashman's work, arguing that "no one can write like him". On January 16, 2020, Halle Bailey confirmed that the song "Part of Your World", from the original film, will appear in the remake. On February 10, 2020, Miranda revealed that he and Menken wrote four new songs for the film. On February 19, 2021, Menken said that the new songs would be a "blend" of his and Miranda's styles. He elaborated that the songs would feature "some rapping" in the vein of Miranda's previous works, as well as a closer style to his usual work.

On September 22, 2021, Menken sat down with Disney's For Scores podcast and confirmed that the film will feature four new songs. He also recalled that Miranda was "daunted" by the prospect of following on in the footsteps of the late Howard Ashman, the lyricist who worked with Menken to write the original film's songs. On November 24, 2021, in a recent interview with Collider, Miranda talked about his admiration for The Little Mermaid and how Ashman and Menken helped shape his childhood. He said:

On January 20, 2022, Halle spoke with Stylecater, saying that she was so emotional while filming "Part of Your World". She said:
On February 17, 2022, during a podcast interview with Variety, Miranda revealed that one of the new songs for the live-action film, "For the First Time," will take place when Ariel is on land in her human form. He also revealed that star Daveed Diggs might rap in the film.

The soundtrack album was made available to pre-save and pre-order on March 13, 2023 and will be released digitally on May 19, 2023 by Walt Disney Records, one week before the film's release.

Release
The film is scheduled to be released theatrically on May 26, 2023, in the United States by Walt Disney Studios Motion Pictures.

Marketing
On September 9, 2022, Rob Marshall and Halle Bailey appeared at the 2022 D23 Expo to introduce an exclusive presentation of the film's "Part of Your World" sequence, which received a positive response from the attendees, who praised Bailey's vocal performance. The film's teaser trailer was released to the public the same day. On October 13, 2022, the first movie poster was released to the public, which Bailey synchronously captioned on Twitter: "Words can’t describe how immensely honored I feel to play the mermaid of my dreams."

In an interview with Entertainment Weekly, Marshall says that this new take on Ariel spotlights a "modern woman". He says that the character goes back to Hans Christian Andersen from another century, but at the same time in 1989, that it felt in some ways like a very modern woman, someone who sees Ariel's life differently than anyone around her, and goes to find that dream. On January 21, 2023, Disney Live Entertainment announced a casting call for character look-alike actresses to portray Bailey's version of Ariel as a character meet-and-greet at Walt Disney World in Orlando, Florida, Disneyland in Anaheim, California and Disneyland Paris in Paris, France as part of the film's promotional campaign. It is currently unknown if this would be temporary or remain permanent after the film's release.

On March 12, 2023, the official trailer was shown during the 95th Academy Awards, introduced on stage by Bailey and McCarthy, and then released online alongside a new poster. Disney reportedly paid ABC $10 million to show the trailer during the ceremony.

Controversy
After the announcement of Halle Bailey as the role of Ariel in July 2019, and after the first teaser was released in September 2022, the film gained both positive and negative responses from the public for casting a Black actress as Ariel, who was originally White in the 1989 animated film. Arguments for the negative response have included that a Black mermaid does not adhere to historical accuracy, that the adaptation should be as close to the original as possible, and that mermaids allegedly can not be Black as they are underwater creatures. Many media outlets as well as Lin-Manuel Miranda, the film's producer and lyricist, criticized the negative response and described it as being racist. Stuart Heritage of The Guardian argued, "The boring spat over the Disney trailer makes idiots of us all – whether Ariel is Black or White, it is clearly a film that should rightfully be ignored then forgotten forever", suggesting instead that there should be a "grotesque scaly mutant as the lead". During an interview on August 12, 2019, Bailey said that "[she doesn't] pay attention to the negativity", while Auliʻi Cravalho, who played Ariel in a musical presentation as a part of The Wonderful World of Disney, expressed excitement at watching Bailey's portrayal of the character. Jodi Benson, the voice actress for Ariel in the 1989 film, praised Bailey, stating, "I think that the spirit of a character is what really matters". Brandy Norwood, the first woman of color to play Cinderella in the 1997 Disney television film of the same, and Anika Noni Rose, the voice of Tiana (Disney's first official African-American Princess), also both praised the casting of Bailey as Ariel. Rachel Zegler, who played Maria in Steven Spielberg's 2021 film version of West Side Story and will play the titular role in Disney's 2024 live-action remake of Snow White, also voiced her support for Bailey. In February 2023, after another first look of the film was released online, which was negatively received by the public, Bailey revealed that she was trying during the film's promotional campaign to ignore the criticisms shown by racist trolls on social media and instead focus on the positives of the anticipation for the film's release. In a cover story for The Face, Bailey further added "I know people are like: 'It's not about race.' But now that I'm her...People don't understand that when you're Black there's this whole other community...It's so important for us to see ourselves."

A poll conducted from July 8–10, 2022, from Hollywood Reporter/Morning Consult found that just under half of Americans supported the idea of minorities playing the roles of characters who had been cast as White. When asked "Thinking about live-action movie remakes of classic cartoons, do you support or oppose actors who are racial and ethnic minorities playing characters who have been White in past films?", 48% answered "strongly" or "somewhat" support, 21% said "strongly" or "somewhat" oppose, while 31% either did not know or had no opinion. The same poll also found a majority in support of remakes that are "as close to their original as possible, including sticking to the race and ethnicity of each character."

Furthermore, after the casting of Melissa McCarthy as Ursula, a portion of fans expressed disappointment that the character will not be portrayed by a drag queen, since it was inspired by the American drag queen Divine.

Reception

Pre-release
Variety reported that the official teaser trailer of The Little Mermaid garnered more than 104 million global views during the first weekend following its release. It surpassed recent Disney live-action releases including Beauty and the Beast with 94 million, Aladdin with 74 million and Cruella with 68 million. After the release of the trailer in September 2022, videos of Black girls positively reacting to it went viral. In December 2022, the film ranked number three as the "Most Anticipated Family Film" of 2023 in a poll conducted by Fandango Media while Halle Bailey and Melissa McCarthy ranked number one as the "Most Anticipated New Performance on the Big Screen" and "Most Anticipated Villain", respectively.

Following its premiere at the 95th Academy Awards on March 12, 2023, the official trailer reportedly generated over 108 million global views within its first 24 hours. It is now among the most watched trailers for any reimagined title in Disney’s growing stable of live-action, and the biggest for a Disney live-action title since the 2019 remake of The Lion King.

Notes

References

External links
 

 

The Little Mermaid (franchise)
2023 films
2023 fantasy films
2020s American films
2020s English-language films
2023 controversies in the United States
Advertising and marketing controversies in film
African-American-related controversies in film
American coming-of-age films
American musical fantasy films
American romantic fantasy films
American romantic musical films
Casting controversies in film
Disney controversies
Disney film remakes
Fantasy film remakes
Film productions suspended due to the COVID-19 pandemic
Films about children
Films about hypnosis
Films about prejudice
Films about princesses
Films about royalty
Films about shapeshifting
Films about wish fulfillment
Films about witchcraft
Films based on adaptations
Films based on The Little Mermaid
Film controversies in the United States
Films directed by Rob Marshall
Films produced by John DeLuca
Films produced by Lin-Manuel Miranda
Films produced by Marc E. Platt
Films produced by Rob Marshall
Films scored by Alan Menken
Films set in the 19th century
Films set in the Caribbean
Films set in castles
Films set in a fictional country
Films shot at Pinewood Studios
Films shot in Sardinia
Films using motion capture
Live-action films based on Disney's animated films
Midlife crisis films
Musical film remakes
Race-related controversies in film
Upcoming films
Upcoming IMAX films
Films about birds
Films about fish
Films about mermaids